Ibragimovo (İbrahim) is a rural locality (a village) in Yuldybayevsky Selsoviet, Kugarchinsky District, Bashkortostan, Russia. The population was 172 as of 2010. There are 3 streets.

Geography 
Ibragimovo is located 8 km southeast of Mrakovo (the district's administrative centre) by road. 1-ye Tupchanovo is the nearest rural locality.

References 

Rural localities in Kugarchinsky District